Thalassobacillus pellis is a Gram-positive, moderately halophilic, endospore-forming, strictly aerobic and motile bacterium from the genus of Thalassobacillus which has been isolated from salted animal hides from Istanbul in Turkey.

References

External links
Type strain of Thalassobacillus pellis at BacDive -  the Bacterial Diversity Metadatabase

 

Bacillaceae
Bacteria described in 2011